The Bangladesh Minority Janata Party (BMJP) is a political party in Bangladesh, focused on the rights of minority communities, formed in 2017.

The party is headquartered in Dhaka. It states that its principles are "Assertiveness on democracy, secularism alongside freedom of all religions, establishment of non-communal political spirit and socialism so called absorption free society and social fair justice."

The Bangladesh Minority Janata Party's election symbol is a goose, and its slogan is "joy to win the humanity."

Reporter at Prothom Alo and the Bangla Tribune noted that the BJMP was formed around the same time as the Bangladesh Janata Party, another new similarly named political party focused on Bangladesh's Hindu minority.

History 
The BMJP was launched in 2017 by a group of 101 core members at an event at the National Press Club. The first elected president was Shyamol Kumar Roy, and the general Secretary was Sukriti Kumar Mondal. At the event, party leaders called for government policies to protect minorities and increase communal harmony, including reintroducing the 1971 constitution, proportionate representation of minorities at the state level, the complete implementation of the Chittagong Hill Tracts Peace Agreement, and socioeconomic development of underprivileged communities. The party also announced that it planned to contest 300 seats in the upcoming elections.

At the end of 2017, the BMJP was one of 76 political parties that applied to Bangladesh's Election Commission seeking official registration. In November 2018, it was announced that the Bangladesh Minority Janata joined the 20-party Bangladesh Nationalist Party-led alliance, along with the Bangladesh Jatiya Dal and the People’s Party of Bangladesh. In response, the party expelled Sukriti Kumar Mondol as general secretary, stating that he joined the alliance without the party's explicit approval. Leaders had previously stated that the party would not collaborate with groups that it felt had a history of anti-minority sentiment.

See also 
 Politics of Bangladesh
 List of political parties in Bangladesh

References

External links 
 Website

Political parties in Bangladesh
Political parties established in 2017
2017 establishments in Bangladesh